Tyler J. Andrew Walker (born 17 October 1996) is an English professional footballer who plays as a forward for  club Coventry City. He is the son of former England defender Des Walker.

An England under-20 international, he made his first-team debut for hometown club Nottingham Forest in March 2015. He has played on loan at Burton Albion, Stevenage, Port Vale, Bolton Wanderers, Mansfield Town, and Lincoln City, and was named on the EFL League Two PFA Team of the Year for the 2018–19 season whilst with Mansfield. He was sold to Coventry City in August 2020 and joined Portsmouth on loan in January 2022.

Club career

Nottingham Forest

2014–15 season
Walker made his professional debut for Nottingham Forest in the Championship as a substitute for Chris Burke in the 92nd minute of a 2–0 win over Rotherham United on 18 March 2015. Walker's first professional goal followed on 7 April in a 2–2 draw with Brentford at Griffin Park after he entered the game as a first-half substitute, on only his fourth first-team appearance. He signed a four-year contract with Forest in June 2015.

2015–16 season
Owing much to a shortage of strikers and manager Dougie Freedman's willingness to give youth an opportunity, Walker played a number of games at the beginning of Forest's 2015–16 season. This included a start in the League Cup, a 4–3 defeat by Walsall at the City Ground on 11 August; a game in which he scored his second goal in professional football.
On 24 March, Walker joined League One club Burton Albion on loan until the end of the 2015–16 season, where he would link-up with former Forest striker and Burton manager Nigel Clough. Walker made his Burton debut four days later as a half-time substitute in a 2–0 defeat at Millwall. In 'The Brewers' following game on 2 April, he came off the bench to score an injury-time equaliser in a 1–1 draw with Bury at the Pirelli Stadium. He returned to Forest at the end of the season having made six appearances for Burton Albion, scoring one goal.

2016–17 season
Speaking in August 2016, new Forest manager Philippe Montanier stated that he was unable to assess Walker due to an injury that left him unable to play a part in pre-season. On 31 August, Walker signed on loan with EFL League Two side Stevenage for the remainder of the 2016–17 season. He made his debut in a 6–1 win over Hartlepool United at Broadhall Way on 2 September; he scored a brace in the match, the first of which was an overhead kick from close range – this performance earned him a place on the EFL team of the week. On 4 October, Walker scored on his debut in the EFL Trophy in a 2–2 draw with Brighton & Hove Albion's U-23 side. Having scored four goals in his first six games for 'The Boro', Walker missed a home game against Plymouth Argyle on 8 October after picking up a "freak injury" in training. He eventually made his return from injury as a substitute in a 4–2 home defeat to Colchester United on 31 December. Speaking after the match, manager Darren Sarll admitted that he "forgot just how good" Walker was.

Walker's loan spell with Stevenage ended earlier than planned, as Forest recalled the player on 13 January with the intention of securing him with a loan move to a League One club. Four days after his recall from Stevenage, Walker joined League One side Port Vale on loan until the end of the 2016–17 season. He scored the opening goal on his debut with a "superb 20-yard strike" for 'The Valiants', before also going on to win a penalty in a 2–2 draw with Bury at Vale Park on 20 January. Walker's poor luck with injuries continued, however, as he sustained a knee ligament injury the following month which caretaker-manager Michael Brown said would keep him out of action for the rest of the season.

2017–18 season
Ahead of the 2017–18 season Forest manager Mark Warburton, who had been appointed as Montanier's permanent successor in March 2017, suggested that Walker would be involved with the first-team, claiming that he had "benefited from being in and around the first team squad here this summer" and that "other players need to go out on loan". On 23 August, Walker came off the bench to score the winning goal in extra-time of a 3–2 victory over Newcastle United at St James' Park in the second round of the EFL Cup. After the game Warburton confirmed in a post-match interview that Walker would remain at Forest for the season. He said: "We've had a host of clubs queuing up for Tyler Walker's services but he'll stay with us because of the reasons you've seen tonight. He's worked tirelessly to recover from injury, had a brilliant pre-season and that resulted in the quality of performance you've seen this evening." On 4 November, he scored the first brace of his senior career in a 4–0 home win over Queens Park Rangers, earning himself a mention in the EFL team of the week. On 28 November, Walker signed a new contract at Forest, due to expire in 2021.

On 31 January 2018, Walker joined fellow Championship side Bolton Wanderers on loan for the rest of the 2017–18 season. He made his Wanderers début in their 1–0 victory over Bristol City, starting the match and lasting 58 minutes before being substituted; he was replaced by fellow Forest loanee Zach Clough. However he featured just five times for the "Trotters" as manager Phil Parkinson instead demoted both Walker and Clough to playing for the youth team.

2018–19 season
On 29 June 2018, Walker joined League Two side Mansfield Town on a season-long loan. On 4 August, he scored 12 minutes into his debut for the "Stags" in a 3–0 win over Newport County at Field Mill. He scored a first-half hat-trick ten days later as Mansfield recorded a 6–1 home victory over Accrington Stanley in the first round of the EFL Cup; manager David Flitcroft said that Walker was "pure class". He scored his 15th goal of the season during a 2–1 Boxing day victory over Bury, taking Mansfield into the automatic promotion places. His scoring tally resulted in speculation that Forest manager Aitor Karanka would recall him in the January transfer window. He was named on League Two's PFA Team of the Year for the 2018–19 campaign, alongside Mansfield teammate Krystian Pearce. He was named as man of the match in the play-off semi-final first-leg against Newport County, but had his penalty saved in the shootout at the end of the second leg as Mansfield were eliminated.

2019–20 season
On 2 August 2019, Walker joined League One side Lincoln City on loan for the 2019–20 season. Manager Danny Cowley said that "he's been on our wish list forever." After scoring 16 goals in 34 games for the "Imps", Walker was recalled to parent club Nottingham Forest by manager Sabri Lamouchi on 30 January. He was then restricted to appearances from the substitutes bench at Forest, though did manage to score against league leaders Leeds United on 8 February. He was cited as being the "next in line" by star striker Lewis Grabban.

Coventry City
On 28 August 2020, Walker joined newly-promoted EFL Championship side Coventry City on a three-year deal for an undisclosed fee. Manager Mark Robins said he had monitored Walker for a number of years. He scored on his debut for Coventry in a 1–0 EFL Cup win at Milton Keynes Dons on 5 September. He scored his first league goal for Coventry in a 3–2 defeat at Watford on 7 November. He scored eight goals from 33 appearances in the 2020–21 season.

Portsmouth (loan)
On 18 January 2022, Walker joined League One side Portsmouth on loan until the end of the 2021–22 season after being signed by former Lincoln manager Danny Cowley. The loan spell was largely disappointing as he scored just one goal in nine starts and six substitute appearances for "Pompey" and was an unused substitute in the final six matches of the campaign despite being the highest paid player at Fratton Park. Jordan Cross of the Portsmouth News wrote that "Walker will go down as one of the worst and most expensive loan mistakes seen at Pompey in recent years".

International career
On 5 September 2015, Walker made his debut for the England under-20s and scored a brace in a 5–0 win over the Czech Republic.

Style of play
Walker is a pacey and athletic forward. Danny Cowley nicknamed him "the Ghost" for his ability to appear from nowhere to score a goal. He is a natural finisher, however his work-rate has been criticised.

Personal life
Walker is the son of former Forest and England defender Des Walker and elder brother of former Queens Park Rangers striker Lewis Walker.

Career statistics

Honours
Individual
EFL League Two PFA Team of the Year: 2018–19

References

External links

England profile at The FA

Living people
1996 births
Footballers from Nottingham
People educated at West Bridgford School
Black British sportsmen
English footballers
England youth international footballers
Association football forwards
Nottingham Forest F.C. players
Burton Albion F.C. players
Stevenage F.C. players
Port Vale F.C. players
Bolton Wanderers F.C. players
Mansfield Town F.C. players
Lincoln City F.C. players
Coventry City F.C. players
Portsmouth F.C. players
English Football League players